Kornel Witkowski (born 3 January 2002) is a Polish figure skater. He is the 2021 Polish national champion and qualified to the final segment at the 2022 European Championships in Tallinn, Estonia.

His brothers, Miłosz and Wiktor Witkowski are also active figure skaters.

Programs

Competitive highlights
CS: Challenger Series; JGP: Junior Grand Prix

References

External links
 
 Kornel Witkowski at the Polish Figure Skating Association

Polish male single skaters
Sportspeople from Łódź
2002 births
Living people
Sportspeople from Lesser Poland Voivodeship